George Constantine may refer to:

 George Constantine (racing driver) (1918–1968), American racing driver
 George Constantine (priest) (c. 1500–1560), British priest
 George Hamilton Constantine (1878–1967), British painter
 George Baxandall Constantine (1902–1969), English jurist